Sailing (also known as yachting until 2000) has been one of the Olympic sports since the Games of the I Olympiad, held in Athens, Greece, in 1896. Despite being scheduled in the first Olympic program, the races were canceled due to severe weather conditions. Apart from the 1904 Summer Olympics, sailing has been present in every edition of the Olympic Games. 
 For the scoring system used for sailing events during the Olympics look at: Scoring systems for Sailing at the Summer Olympics
 A directory page to all Olympic sailors is given at: List of sailors at the Summer Olympics
 Information about the Sailing at specific Summer Olympics or the used equipment can be found using the table below:
 Gender – Until 1988, sailing was a gender neutral 'open' sport where male and female sailors competed together. Even in 1900, several women participated at the Olympic sailing regattas. The exception to this is the post World War II 1948 Olympics where the IOC decided the events should only be open to male sailors.  In 1988, the first exclusive women's sailing event was introduced. Sailing was also one of the first sports to introduce a compulsory mixed gender events in 2016 the Mixed Multihull was introduced.
 Discipline – Most of the Olympic sailing competitions were done in what is called a fleet race format. At some Olympics, however, was also the match race format, or a mixed fleet/match race format.
 Classes – Over time, different classes of boat featured at the Olympics. Initially, the classes were specified in tons, then later in meters, feet or generic names. For the discontinued classes, the Vintage Yachting Games were introduced in 2008.
 Medal Tables – Great Britain leads the Olympic sailing medal ranking table.

Summary

Note: Competitions were cancelled at the 1896 Olympics.

Timeline

However this event had to be given up since there were no boats available from Greece and no foreign entries.
 1900: Two venues were used to host the 1900 Sailing events. One in Meulan  till   for the inshore races on the river Seine. And one in Le Havre  till  for the Offshore races on the English Channel. In Meulan six classes were used over several days. About 55 boats and a little less than 150 sailors are documented, included the first female gold medalist Hélène de Pourtalès. In Le Havre two classes were used for the offshore event. About 10 boats made the competition. Crewmembers were not documented, just the owners and/or helmsmen.
 1904: Sailing was not a part of the Olympic program.
 1908: At the 1907 The Hague Conference of the IOC Ryde at the Isle of Wight was appointed to host the sailing regattas, for all classes, of the games of the IVth Olympiad. However, when there were only two British entries for the 12 Metre matches, and both yachts were located at the Firth of Clyde, the decision was made to use Hunters Quay as a second venue. In 1906 international meetings were organized to solve the problem of the differences in the performance of the different yachts. Finally in Paris, October 1907 the first International Rule was ratified. During the meeting in 1907 the IOC made the decision to use the International Rule classes for the Olympic regattas (6, 7, 8 and 12 Metre).
 1912: When Sweden was assigned to host the 1912 Olympic Games two cities wanted to be the venue for the sailing program. Gothenburg and Stockholm. Gothenburg claimed that it was a much shorter passage for the overseas entries (about  less) than it was to Stockholm. Stockholm however got the sailing program because of then all Olympic events should be in the same vicinity. Also the decision was made to use the International Rule classes again for the Olympic regattas (6, 8, 10 and 12 Metre).
 1920: When Antwerp was assigned to host the 1920 Olympic Games, Ostend was appointed for the sailing contests. Ostend – "The Queen of the Belgian sea-side resorts" – offers fair condition for sailing on the North Sea. Although there are tidal conditions the current is reasonable predictable. Local knowledge does not have too much influence on the races. The wind conditions are also good for sailing. In the case of the 1920 Summer Olympic regatta's the prevailing breeze did not show. Most races had to be sailed under light air conditions. The competition was open for a total of sixteen classes. Two classes had a "No show".
 1924: After the massive number of classes used four years earlier only three classes were selected for the 1924 Olympics. Again there was a one design class. The two other classes were construction classes of the International Metre type. Two locations were used: Meulan was the venue for the Olympic regatta's in the French National Monotype. The host club for the 1924 Olympic Sailing at Meulan was the Cercle de la Voile de Paris. The race conditions at Meulan during the Olympic regatta were not ideal. The light breeze during the first elimination series could hardly make the sailing interesting. Le Havre was the venue for the Olympic regattas for the 6 and 8 Metre. The host club for the 1924 Olympic Sailing at Le Havre was the Société des Régates du Havre. Due to the Easterly winds the courses at Le Havre were mostly reaches. Sailing a windward leg was not really tested. This however was more or less custom for that era. Furthermore, this was the first Olympic regatta were just one competing team per class per country was allowed.
 1928: Like in the 1924 Olympics only three classes were chosen. There was the revival of the 12' Dinghy from the 1920 Olympics and again the proven 6 and 8 Metre classes. This Olympic sailing regatta can be considered as the first Olympic regatta with a high quality of racing since there were: Well selected classes that represented sailing; Sufficient competitors per class and good and fair sailing conditions. The only disadvantage was the daily passing of the Oranje Locks.

Olympic Classes & Events 
Over the years the classes used in the Olympic Sailing Program were replaced from time to time. This table shows this development:

Gender Criteria: Open events have no gender requirements where as mixed events require male and female competitors
Events Notes: Events in "()" Brackets were scheduled but did not take place and therefore not included in the totals

Boat types

Race types

Olympic sailing venues

Pictures will be replaced by more relevant photos.

Medal table 
This list includes Olympic medals in years up to and including 2020.

Nations
This table is based upon the names of the sailors who are documented in the Official Olympic Reports.

The last column shows the total number of competitors sent from each country.

 Early Olympic do not have complete data so some assumption on crew sizes and gender have been made to give a better indication of the number of people involved.

Multiple gold medalists 
Brazilians Torben Grael and Robert Scheidt and Briton Ben Ainslie are the only Olympic sailors with five Olympic medals. The most successful sailor is Ainslie with four gold medals and one silver, one of only four athletes to win four consecutive gold medals in individual events, along with Danish sailor Paul Elvstrøm.

See also
Sailing at the Summer Paralympics
List of Olympic medalists in sailing
Olympic sailing classes

References

External links
Olympics.org Sailing Microsite
Sailing at the Summer Olympics from Sports-Reference.com

 
Sports at the Summer Olympics
Olympics